Let It Beep is the second album by Royal Bangs. The album was released on September 15, 2009 on Audio Eagle Records, but was also released on City Slang Records.

Reviews

Reviews for the album were positive. Rick Anderson of AllMusic noted, "For their second album, the Royal Bangs are back on Patrick Carney's Audio Eagle label, and their sound is, if anything, even more insane than it was the first time around. BBC Music editor, Mike Diver described it as "varied but never lacking cohesion, Let It Beep is a charming and entirely unforeseen hit for tastes demanding their rock a little rough-hewn and happily unaffected. That it makes KoL Kings of Leon sound as sonically redundant as U2 and Oasis is merely an accidental bonus."

Track listing

Personnel

 Brandon Biondo, band member
 Henry Gibson, band member
 Chris Rusk, band member
 Ryan Schaefer, band member, producer
 Sam Stratton, band member
 Ben Vehorn, Recording and Mixing Engineer
 Garrett Haines, Mastering Engineer
 Craig Branum, Illustrator
 Michael Carney, Layout
 Jody White, Management
 Sam Hunt, Booking

References

2009 albums
Royal Bangs albums